"Bent" is a song by American alternative rock band Matchbox Twenty. The rock ballad was shipped to radio on April 17, 2000, as the lead single from their second album, Mad Season, and was given a commercial release in the United States on July 5, 2000. "Bent" became the band's first and only song to top the US Billboard Hot 100, reaching number one on the chart dated July 22, 2000, and spending one week at the position. The song also topped the RPM Top Singles chart in Canada for five nonconsecutive weeks.

Background and writing
Rob Thomas told Billboard magazine that it's "a love song and a rock song; there's a hopeful tone to it. It's kind of like the person is saying, 'As misguided as I may be, these are things that it takes to be with me.'" This was Thomas' first attempt at a love song and he believes it is co-dependent of the 21st century. Thomas spoke on Storytellers that the song is about two people who are "both messed up", but they are together, so it does not matter.

Music video
The video, directed by Pedro Romhanyi, seems to be a bit of a play on Rob Thomas' increased profile following the 1999 mega-hit, "Smooth", since it features other members of the band mistreating him. It starts with him being hit by a car driven by Adam Gaynor. As he lies on the ground, Kyle Cook shows up and empties Thomas of all money in his wallet. After this, Rob recovers from the car hit and walks off, singing the chorus. After the first chorus, he bumps into Paul Doucette. Rob sings a few more lines to a clearly unimpressed Paul, who basically shoves Rob out of his way. At this point Rob walks off again, singing the second chorus, and the wind seems to hit him stronger than it hits other people. He then heads into an alley where day and night intermix. He is assaulted yet again by Kyle Cook, at which point, Brian Yale shows up apparently to help him off the ground. Rob refuses the hand and walks off, eventually leaving the alleyway and emerging back into the daylight, when the events seem to recur from the beginning of the video.

Track listings
US CD single
 "Bent"
 "Push" (acoustic)

UK and Australian CD single
 "Bent" – 4:16
 "Don't Let Me Down" (live from Australia) – 4:11
 "Busted" (live from Australia) – 4:33

European CD single
 "Bent" – 4:19
 "Don't Let Me Down" (live from Australia) – 4:16

Personnel
Personnel are adapted from the European CD single liner notes.
 Rob Thomas – vocals
 Kyle Cook – lead guitar, background vocals, lead vocals on "Don't Let Me Down"
 Adam Gaynor – rhythm guitar, background vocals
 Brian Yale – bass
 Paul Doucette – drums

Charts

Weekly charts

Year-end charts

Decade-end charts

All-time charts

Release history

References

2000s ballads
2000 songs
2000 singles
APRA Award winners
Atlantic Records singles
Billboard Hot 100 number-one singles
Lava Records singles
Matchbox Twenty songs
Music videos directed by Pedro Romhanyi
Rock ballads
RPM Top Singles number-one singles
Song recordings produced by Matt Serletic
Songs written by Rob Thomas (musician)